Robert Valentine was a Major League Baseball catcher who played for one season. He played for the New York Mutuals for one game on May 20 during the 1876 New York Mutuals season, making him the very first major league player whose career lasted a single game.

External links

Year of birth unknown
Year of death unknown
New York Mutuals players
Major League Baseball catchers
19th-century baseball players